Henrietta Maria Stanley, Baroness Stanley of Alderley (née Dillon-Lee; 21 December 1807 – 16 February 1895), was a British Canadian-born political hostess and campaigner for the education of women in England. 

She was a founder and benefactor of Girton College,Cambridge at the University of Cambridge, but also a signatory of a petition against women's suffrage. She was the grandmother of philosopher Bertrand Russell.

Early life and family 
Born in Halifax, Nova Scotia, Lady Stanley was the eldest child of Henry Dillon, 13th Viscount Dillon, and Henrietta Browne, the sister of Dominick Browne, 1st Baron Oranmore and Browne. She was a descendant of both Charles II (by his mistress Barbara Villiers) and James II of England (by his mistress Catherine Sedley). Her ancestors were Roman Catholic and had had pronounced Jacobite leanings; one of them was Maréchal de camp Arthur Dillon, a supporter of the Old Pretender who lived in exile in France. Her grandfather Charles Dillon, 12th Viscount Dillon eventually converted to Anglicanism in 1767.

In the 1790s her father served as an officer in the "Catholic Irish Brigade" that had been partly stationed in Nova Scotia. In 1814, Henrietta and her family moved to Florence, capital of the Grand Duchy of Tuscany, where she attended the receptions of Princess Louise of Stolberg-Gedern, the widow of the Young Pretender. Her non-English upbringing was prominent and her grandson, the philosopher Bertrand Russell, commented:

My grandmother's outlook, throughout her life, was in some ways more Continental than English. She was always downright, free from prudery, and eighteenth-century rather than Victorian in her conversation. Her French and Italian were faultless, and she was passionately interested in Italian unity.

In Florence she met Edward Stanley and married him on 7 October 1826. She became Baroness Eddisbury when her husband was created a peer in 1848. Two years later he succeeded as Baron Stanley of Alderley, by which title the couple was subsequently known. She corresponded with her mother-in-law, Maria, who had received an exceptional education. Maria wrote to her to applaud that she had admonished her son John Stanley for calling Indian people, "niggers".

Education campaigns 

Lady Stanley cultivated friendships with Thomas Carlyle, F. D. Maurice, and, from 1861, Benjamin Jowett. She presided over an intellectual and political salon, and was one of the original 'lady visitors' of Queen's College, London, founded by Maurice in 1848. This marked her stronger involvement in the campaign for the education of women and her decision to defend, as she later put it, "the right of women to the highest culture hitherto reserved to men".

She proceeded to take part in the campaign whose aim was to secure the admission of women to the university local examinations. In 1867, she turned down an offer to become a member of the committee planning a women's university college, saying that "it is not liked to see my name before the public". The death of her husband on 16 June 1869, however, left her more free to pursue her campaign. The same year, along with Emily Davies and Barbara Bodichon, Lady Stanley founded Girton College. She soon became a prominent supporter of the National Union for the Improvement of Women's Education (1871), the Girls' Public Day School Company that became the Girls Day School Trust (1872) and the London School of Medicine for Women (1874).

In early 1872 she was again invited to participate more formally in the administration of Girton, which she now accepted, and she joined the building subcommittee. The project, seen as daring and even scandalous, benefited from her social position; Lady Stanley considered "social position, good sense and power of governing and conciliating" necessary for the mistress of the college. She donated both money and time to Girton, standing in as its mistress during the illness of Annie Austin, and providing £1,000 for the establishment of its first library, which was built in 1884 and called the Stanley Library. One of the few executive committee members who dared confront Davies, Lady Stanley vehemently opposed the construction of a chapel, and instead favoured improving staff salaries and equipment. In 1888, she helped found Sydenham High Junior and Senior Schools with Maria Grey, Mary Gurney and Emily Shirreff.

Politics and character 
The Baroness Stanley of Alderley had great influence in social and political circles. While he was Patronage Secretary, Edward Stanley was described by Lord Palmerston as "joint whip with Mrs Stanley". She fell out with Prime Minister William Ewart Gladstone over the issue of home rule and became closely associated with Women's Liberal Unionist Association. Along with Lady Randolph Churchill and the fellow female education campaigner Lady Frederick Cavendish, among others, she was a signatory of an appeal against female suffrage in June 1889.

Bertrand Russell, her grandson, feared her ridicule and described her as "an eighteenth century type, rationalistic and unimaginative, keen on enlightenment, and contemptuous of Victorian goody-goody priggery". "Grandmama Stanley at Dover Street", according to Russell, "had a considerable contempt for everything that she regarded as silly". She died at her home in Dover Street, which she had shared with her unmarried daughter Maude.

Issue
 Henry Edward John, 3rd Baron Stanley of Alderley (1827–1903)
 Alice Margaret (1828–1910), wife of Augustus Pitt Rivers
 (Henrietta) Blanche (1830–1921), later Countess of Airlie, wife of David Ogilvy; a grandmother of Clementine Churchill, and a great-grandmother of the Mitford sisters
 Maude Alethea (1832–1915), a youth work pioneer
 Cecilia (d. 1839)
 John Constantine (1837–1878), husband of hostess and politician Mary Jeune, Baroness St Helier
 Edward Lyulph Stanley, 4th Baron Stanley of Alderley (1839–1925)
 Algernon Charles Stanley (1843–1928), Roman Catholic Bishop of Emmaus (in partibus)
 Katherine Louisa (1844–74), later Viscountess Amberley, suffragette and birth control proponent; mother of the philosopher Bertrand Russell
 Rosalind Frances (1845–1921), later Countess of Carlisle, became the chatelaine of Castle Howard and a radical temperance campaigner.

Lady Stanley's great-great-granddaughter, Nancy Mitford, wrote of the favouritism she showed in treating her children. Her eldest son, Henry, was her favourite, while her eldest daughter, Alice, was her least favourite and treated accordingly.

Arms

References

External links 
Biography of Lady Stanley of Alderley, including three portraits
Girton College on Lady Stanley
Photograph of Lady Stanley and her daughter Rosalind 

1807 births
1895 deaths
People from Halifax, Nova Scotia
Canadian political hostesses
English people of Irish descent
Women of the Victorian era
Daughters of viscounts
Henrietta
Stanley of Alderney
English educational theorists
People associated with Girton College, Cambridge
Founders of colleges of the University of Cambridge